The Bloodless Sand is a 1964 TV play broadcast by the Australian Broadcasting Corporation. It was a ballet and was directed by Christopher Muir. Australian TV drama was relatively rare at the time.

Premise
A Spanish maid is in love with a matador.

Cast
Patricia Cox 		
Paul Hammond 		
Vlado Juras 		
Eileen Wilson

References

External links

Australian television plays
Australian television plays based on ballets
Australian Broadcasting Corporation original programming
English-language television shows
1964 television plays